Mons Hadley is a massif in the northern portion of the Montes Apenninus, a range in the northern hemisphere of the Moon.

To the southwest of this mountain is a valley that served as the landing site for the Apollo 15 expedition. To the southwest of this same valley is the slightly smaller Mons Hadley Delta (δ) peak with a height of about 3.5 km above the valley floor. Mons Hadley Delta was visited and sampled by the astronauts, but Mons Hadley itself was only photographed from the surface.  To the west of these peaks is the sinuous Rima Hadley rille.

These features were named after the English mathematician John Hadley.

Rima Hadley

This sinuous lunar rille follows a course generally to the northeast, toward the Mons Hadley peak, for which it is named. This feature is centered at selenographic coordinates 25.0° N, 3.0° E, and lies within a diameter of 80 km. It begins at the crater Béla, an elongated formation with the long axis oriented to the northwest.

Nearby craters

Four small craters near this rille have been assigned names by the IAU. These are listed in the table below.

Satellite craters
By convention these features are identified on lunar maps by placing the letter on the side of the crater midpoint that is closest to Mons Hadley.

The crater Joy was formerly known as Hadley A, prior to being renamed by the IAU in 1973.

See also
 List of mountains on the Moon by height

References

External links

 LTO-41B4 Hadley — L&PI Lunar Topographic Orthophotomap

Hadley, Mons